PNC Arena (originally Raleigh Entertainment & Sports Arena and formerly the RBC Center) is an indoor arena located in Raleigh, North Carolina. The arena seats 18,680 for ice hockey and 19,500 for basketball, including 61 suites, 13 luxury boxes and 2,000 club seats. The building has three concourses and a 300-seat restaurant.

PNC Arena is home to the Carolina Hurricanes of the National Hockey League and the NC State Wolfpack men's basketball team of NCAA Division I. The arena neighbors Carter–Finley Stadium, home of Wolfpack Football; the North Carolina State Fairgrounds and Dorton Arena (on the Fairgrounds). The arena also hosted the Carolina Cobras of the Arena Football League from 2000 to 2002. It is the fourth-largest arena in the ACC (after the JMA Wireless Dome, KFC Yum! Center and the Dean Smith Center) and the eighth-largest arena in the NCAA.

History
The idea of a new basketball arena to replace the Wolfpack's longtime home, Reynolds Coliseum, first emerged in the 1980s under the vision of then-Wolfpack coach Jim Valvano. In 1989, the NCSU Trustees approved plans to build a 23,000-seat arena. The Centennial Authority was created by the North Carolina General Assembly in 1995 as the governing entity of the arena, then financed by state appropriation, local contributions, and university fundraising. The Centennial Authority refocused the project into a multi-use arena, leading to the 1997 relocation agreement of the then-Hartford Whalers, who would become the Carolina Hurricanes. Construction began that year and was completed in 1999 with an estimated cost of $158 million, which was largely publicly financed by a hotel and restaurant tax. The Hurricanes agreed to pay $60 million of the cost, and the state of North Carolina paid $18 million. As part of the deal, the Hurricanes assumed operational control of the arena.

Known as the Raleigh Entertainment and Sports Arena (ESA) from 1999 to 2002, it was renamed the RBC Center after an extended search for a corporate sponsor. RBC Bank, the US division of the Royal Bank of Canada, acquired 20-year naming rights for a reported $80 million. On June 19, 2011, it was announced that PNC Financial Services bought US assets of RBC Bank and acquired the naming rights to the arena pending approval by the regulatory agencies. On December 15, 2011, the Centennial Authority, the landlord of the arena, approved a name change for the facility to PNC Arena. The name change officially took place on March 15, 2012. On a normal hockey day, PNC Arena has more than 400 people on duty for security and concessions.

The arena has also seen use in fictional media, as a season four episode of The CW series One Tree Hill saw the Tree Hill High School Ravens playing a NCHSAA championship game in the venue. It was also the taping site for the 2005 Jeopardy! College Tournament.

Hockey
Raleigh experienced its first NHL game on October 29, 1999, when the Hurricanes hosted the New Jersey Devils on the building's opening night. The first playoff series at the Entertainment and Sports Arena were held in 2001 when the Hurricanes hosted the Devils in games 3, 4, and 6, of the 2001 Stanley Cup Playoffs, but the Hurricanes lost in 6. The ESA (by then the renamed RBC Center) hosted games of both the 2002 Stanley Cup Playoffs and Finals; however, the Hurricanes lost in the Finals. On June 19, 2006, the Hurricanes were on home ice for a decisive game seven of the Stanley Cup Final, defeating the Edmonton Oilers 3–1 to bring the franchise its first Stanley Cup and North Carolina its first and only major professional sports championship. The arena hosted the playoffs again in 2009, with the Hurricanes losing in the Eastern Conference Finals. In 2019, the arena hosted playoff hockey for the first time in 10 years, with fans setting a single-game record attendance of 19,495 in game 4 of the second round versus the Islanders. This record would be further extended on May 14, 2022, when the Hurricanes defeated the Boston Bruins 3-2 in game 7 of the first round, to advance to the Second Round, in front of 19,513 fans.

Top attended Hurricanes games at PNC Arena
Attendance numbers come from press numbers from ESPN, the PNC Arena, the Raleigh News and Observer, as well as Hockey Reference.com. Numbers in italics represent playoff games.

Renovations

In 2003, a ribbon board which encircles the arena bowl was installed. In 2008, the arena renovated its sound system. Clair Brothers Systems installed a combination of JBL line arrays to provide improved audio coverage for all events. In June 2009, video crews installed a new Daktronics HD scoreboard. It replaced the ten-year-old scoreboard that had been in the arena since its opening in 1999. The scoreboard was full LED and four-sided with full video displays, whereas the previous scoreboard was eight-sided; four of those sides featured alternating static dot-matrix displays (very much outdated for today's standards). In addition, the scoreboard featured an octagonal top section with full video capability, along with two rings above and below the main video screens; they were similar to the ribbon board encircling the arena.

In October 2015, architects met with the Centennial Authority to discuss a potential arena renovation. Their proposal includes all-new entrances, a new rooftop restaurant and bar, covered tailgating sections, and moving the administrative offices elsewhere in the arena as a result. The plans also call for new office spaces, additional meeting spaces, removing stairwells and aisles, adding wider seats, and perhaps building lounges on the mezzanine levels below the main concourse level. Project costs were not decided, as the architects were given until May/June 2016 to come up with estimates. The cost was estimated to be almost $200 million. The Centennial Authority would have to approve the estimates before official voting. If the funds had been approved the renovation would've started in 2020 and been completed by 2022 at the earliest. However, this would not come to pass.

During mid-2016, the ribbon boards were upgraded and a second ribbon board was added to the upper level fascia. Static advertising signs inside the lower bowl of the arena were replaced with LED video boards. In 2018, they renovated the NHL home locker rooms and replaced the seating in the upper bowl as well as an ice/court projection system that was first used December 23 at a Hurricanes game against the Boston Bruins.

In April 2019, it was announced that the arena would receive a new Daktronics video board later that year. The board would be nearly three times as large as the then-current board. The new video board would feature a full 360 degree display, two underbelly screens and two underbelly static advertising signs. It will also be the first of its kind and one of only a few 360 degree video boards in the NHL. The board would cost $4.7 million, would stretch blue line to blue line, and would be . Original plans called for a 2018 installation, but the project was postponed due to structural/roof issues. The old video board was taken down on June 1, 2019. The new board debuted on September 18, 2019.

In November 2019, Raleigh approved funding for the arena at $9 million a year for 25 years for arena enhancements, putting the grand total to $200 million. Some concessions in the arena were updated in 2019 in addition to the LED upgrade. These included a new marketplace in the upper concourse as well as other concessions renovated and a new color changing lighting system on the exterior of the South End. The Centennial Authority (operating group) and the Hurricanes are also meeting to further discuss the future renovations and the future of the Hurricanes at PNC Arena. Most offices were expected to move out before the 2020–21 NHL season and renovations were to start. Plans for renovations are currently on hold.

In April 2022, it was announced that Invisalign would become an official arena partner, extending their partnership with the Carolina Hurricanes. Following this announcement, the East and West arena entrances were respectively renamed to become the “Invisalign East Entrance” and “Invisalign West Entrance.”

After being put on hold during the COVID-19 pandemic, the renovation project was reconsidered. The Centennial Authority met with local officials, the Carolina Hurricanes, and National Hockey League Commissioner Gary Bettman in May 2022. After discussion, the Centennial Authority approved the continuation of the project, while also inviting CAA ICON to design the project. Plans call for renovations inside the arena, as well as on surrounding land to become “one of the top entertainment venues in the Southeast.” Additionally, there are plans for a new outdoor concert venue on site. 

In June 2022, the arena board approved a $25.8 million budget for the fiscal year (begins July 2022), that would be utilized on 17 different enhancement projects, including a $7.8 million replacement of the arena roof.

Notable events
In addition to hockey and college basketball, PNC Arena hosts a wide array of concerts, family shows, and other events each year. Past performers include Prince, Bruce Springsteen, Cher, Eric Clapton, Taylor Swift, Billy Joel, Justin Timberlake, Big Time Rush, Elton John, Lady Gaga, One Direction, Celine Dion, George Strait, Bon Jovi, Journey, Def Leppard, Keith Urban, and many other artists. Family shows have included Ringling Bros. and Barnum & Bailey Circus, Sesame Street Live, Disney On Ice, and the Harlem Globetrotters. The arena has also hosted several college hockey games between NC State and North Carolina.

The arena hosted the Central Intercollegiate Athletic Association (CIAA) men's basketball tournament from 1999 to 2008.
As the RBC Center, the arena hosted the 2005 Jeopardy College Championship with Peter Ellis representing North Carolina State University.
The arena was a site for Rounds 1 and 2 of the 2004, 2008, 2014, and 2016 NCAA Division I men's basketball tournament, respectively.
The arena set a single-event attendance record of 20,052 fans on January 28, 2019, for Metallica's WorldWired Tour.
The arena hosted Apex Legends Global Series Championship on July 7-10. June 6, 2022.

List of concerts and other events

See also
 List of NCAA Division I basketball arenas

References

Notes
 NCSU Athletics.
 RBC Center: History.
 The Hockey News. 59.37 (2006): 6.
 Live Sound: Clair Systems Revamps RBC Center Audio with JBL Loudspeakers. Retrieved May 15, 2009 from 
 RBC Center Gets New Scoreboard. Retrieved June 7, 2009 from

External links

 Official site
 PNC Arena – NC State Athletics

1999 establishments in North Carolina
Sports venues completed in 1999
Basketball venues in North Carolina
College basketball venues in the United States
Indoor ice hockey venues in the United States
National Hockey League venues
NC State Wolfpack basketball venues
Sports venues in Raleigh, North Carolina
Indoor arenas in North Carolina
Carolina Hurricanes